Spiced beef is a form of salt beef, cured with spices and braised or boiled. It is a traditional festive dish in many countries. In England and Wales it has been known for more than 300 years. It remains a traditional Christmas or New Year dish in Ireland.

England and Wales
Elizabeth David notes that spiced beef has been a familiar dish in English cookery for at least 300 years, sometimes under the name of "Hunting Beef" or "Beef à l'Écarte". A recipe for spiced beef is given in John Simpson's A Complete System of Cookery (1806). He comments, "This is more a Christmas dish, than any other time of the year, not but it may be done any time, and is equally good". His recipe calls for only  saltpetre, salt and sugar to be rubbed into the meat every few days for three weeks. He does not specify which cut of beef to use.  

David specifies round or silverside, and to Simpson's ingredients she adds crushed black pepper, allspice berries and juniper berries. The last, she notes, appear in old recipes from Yorkshire, Cumberland, Wales, Sussex and other places where juniper grew wild. The spices are rubbed into the meat every day for 9–14 days. The meat is then cooked slowly in a low oven for between 5 and 7½ hours.

In The Oxford Companion to Food, Alan Davidson lists other spices sometimes used in addition to those specified by Simpson and David: cinnamon, cloves, ginger, mace and nutmeg.

Ireland
Unlike England and Wales, where the dish went out of fashion before the 20th century, in Ireland spiced beef has remained what Davidson calls "an important part of Christmas fare". The cut of beef in the Irish version varies according to different writers; cuts suggested include round, silverside, topside, rump, and brisket. The meat is rubbed with some or all of the spices mentioned above, and then usually boiled, broiled or semi-steamed in water, Guinness (or a similar stout). It is served cold, usually in thin slices, often with brown bread and apricot and almond chutney.

The chef and food writer Rowley Leigh wrote in 2009:

In Classic Irish, a 1999 book of Irish recipes, Matthew Drennan writes, "Christmas in Ireland would not be complete without a cold side of spiced beef to see you through the holiday season".

Other countries
Davidson mentions that spiced beef is a traditional festive dish in many other countries, but does not specify which. Some spiced beef dishes, including pastrami and Sauerbraten, differ from the English and Irish versions, among other ways, by being wet-cured in brine or other liquid.

See also
 List of Irish dishes

References

Sources
 
 
 
 

Beef dishes
Christmas food
Cumbrian cuisine
English cuisine
Irish cuisine
Welsh cuisine
Yorkshire cuisine